Trevor Stuart Malloch  (2 December 1928 – 2 November 2020) was a New Zealand cricketer. He played in two first-class matches for Wellington in 1953/54.

As a golfer, Malloch won the Manawatū Golf Club championship, and he was awarded life membership of the New Zealand Golf Association and the New Zealand Sports Turf Institute. He was also active in local community affairs, and served as chair of the Central Energy Trust and the Palmerston North Hospital Board. In the 2004 Queen's Birthday Honours, he was awarded the Queen's Service Medal for public services.

Malloch died in Feilding on 2 November 2020, at the age of 91, and was the oldest player for Wellington at the time of his death.

See also
 List of Wellington representative cricketers

References

External links
 

1928 births
2020 deaths
New Zealand cricketers
Wellington cricketers
Cricketers from Wellington City
Recipients of the Queen's Service Medal
Members of district health boards in New Zealand